International Diving Schools Association (IDSA) was formed in 1982 with the primary purpose of developing common international standards for commercial diver training.

The Association is concerned with offshore, inshore and inland commercial diving and some specialist non-diving qualifications such as diving supervisors, diving medical technicians and life support technicians.  It has published international diver training standards based on the consensus of members  which provide a basic standard of comparison for commercial diver training standards, with the stated intention of:-       
Improving safety
Providing contractors with a direct input to the diver training syllabus
Enabling contractors to bid across national borders on a more even playing field
Improving diver quality
Providing divers with greater job opportunities
IDSA provides a Table of Equivalence of various national commercial diver training standards.

IDSA standards are recognized in the Danish, Norwegian and Italian (Sicily) legislation.

References

Underwater diver training